Arran Spencer Steele (born 14 January 1975) is a former English cricketer.  Steele was a right-handed batsman who bowled leg break.  He was born in Corby, Northamptonshire.

Steele represented the Northamptonshire Cricket Board in a single List A match against Wiltshire in the 1999 NatWest Trophy.  In his only List A match, he scored 23 runs.

His father, David, played Test and One Day International cricket for England.  He also played first-class cricket for Northamptonshire, the Marylebone Cricket Club, Derbyshire and Leicestershire, as well as List A cricket for Bedfordshire.  His uncle, John, played first-class cricket for Leicestershire, Natal and Glamorgan.  His brother, Mark, played a single List A match for Staffordshire.

References

External links
Arran Steele at Cricinfo
Arran Steele at CricketArchive

1975 births
Living people
People from Corby
English cricketers
Northamptonshire Cricket Board cricketers